KXMO-FM is a radio station airing a classic hits format licensed to Owensville, Missouri, broadcasting on 95.3 MHz FM.  The station is owned by KTTR-KZNN, Inc.

History
KXMO-FM began broadcasting in 2001, airing an oldies format. In 2018, they switched to a classic hits format, playing songs from the 70s and 80s. They also adapted the slogan, “Your Classic Hits’ Station”.

KXMO features hourly weather updates from KYTV-TV “KY3” in Springfield, Missouri.

Previous Logos

References

External links

Classic hits radio stations in the United States
XMO-FM
Radio stations established in 2001
2001 establishments in Missouri